C8 was a general entertainment TV channel broadcasting to people in Hungary. The channel launched on 1 April 2014 in Hungary and 5 May 2014 in Czech Republic, Slovakia, Serbia and Romania, replacing Animax. The channel ceased on 30 December 2015 in Czech Republic, Slovakia, Serbia and Romania. On January 1, 2018, C8 was shut down completely and Minimax fled up the overnight spot making Minimax to run 24 hours for the first time.

Programming schedule

See also
 AMC Networks International
 Minimax
 Animax

AMC Networks International
Defunct television channels in Hungary
Television networks in Hungary
Television channels and stations established in 2014
2014 establishments in Hungary
Mass media in Budapest